Timothy Killeen (10 May 1923 – 2 March 1993) was an Irish Fianna Fáil politician. A company secretary, Killeen stood at the 1969 and 1973 general elections but was first elected to Dáil Éireann as a Teachta Dála (TD) for the Dublin Artane constituency at the 1977 general election. Following constituency revisions, Killeen contested the 1981 general election for the Dublin North-West constituency but was defeated. He failed to be elected at the February 1982 and November 1982 general elections.

References

1923 births
1993 deaths
Fianna Fáil TDs
Local councillors in Dublin (city)
Members of the 21st Dáil
Politicians from County Dublin